There were five special elections to the United States House of Representatives in 1927 during the 70th United States Congress.

List of elections 
Elections are listed by date and district.

|-
| 
| Ladislas Lazaro
|  | Democratic
| 1912
|  | Incumbent died March 30, 1927.New member elected August 23, 1927.Democratic hold.
| nowrwap | 

|-
| 
| Walter W. Magee
|  | Republican
| 1914
|  | Incumbent died May 25, 1927.New member elected November 8, 1927.Republican hold.
| nowrwap | 

|-
| 
| Ambrose E. B. Stephens
|  | Republican
| 1918
|  | Incumbent died February 12, 1927.New member elected November 8, 1927.Republican hold.
| nowrap | 

|-
| 
| James M. Hazlett
|  | Republican
| 1926
|  | Incumbent resigned October 20, 1927.New member elected November 8, 1927.Republican hold.
| nowrwap | 

|-
| 
| William Vaile
|  | Republican
| 1918
|  | Incumbent died July 2, 1927.New member elected November 15, 1927.Democratic gain.
| nowrap | 

|}

See also 
 69th United States Congress
 70th United States Congress

References 

 
1927